Platanillo is a common name for several plants and may refer to:

Canna indica
Heliconia collinsiana